Charnay-lès-Mâcon (literally Charnay near Mâcon) is a commune in the Saône-et-Loire department in the region of Bourgogne-Franche-Comté in eastern France.

Population

Economy 
 Wine production
 Mâcon airport

See also 
 Communes of the Saône-et-Loire department

References

External links 

  Official Web site

Communes of Saône-et-Loire